Fielding is a locality in the Shire of Carpentaria, Queensland, Australia.

Geography 
Geographically Fielding is part of the Gulf Country. The Norman River flows through the locality from the south-east (Savannah) to the north (Stokes/Claraville).

Education 
There are no schools in Fielding. The nearest schools are in Normanton (P–10) and Croydon (P–6). There is no secondary Years 11 and 12 schooling in the area.

References 

Shire of Carpentaria
Localities in Queensland